Clear-cell renal-cell carcinoma (CCRCC) is a type of renal-cell carcinoma.

Genetics

Cytogenetics 
 Alterations of chromosome 3p segments occurs in 70–90% of CCRCCs
 Inactivation of von Hippel–Lindau disease (VHL) gene by gene mutation and promoter hypermethylation
 Gain of chromosome 5q
 Loss of chromosomes 8p, 9p, and 14q

Molecular genetics 
Several frequently mutated genes were discovered in CCRCC: VHL, KDM6A/UTX, SETD2, KDM5C/JARID1C and MLL2. PBRM1 is also commonly mutated in CCRCC.

Histogenesis 

CCRCC is derived from the proximal convoluted tubule.

Microscopy 
Generally, the cells have a clear cytoplasm, are surrounded by a distinct cell membrane and contain round and uniform nuclei.

Microscopically, CCRCCs are graded by the ISUP/WHO as follows:
 Grade 1: Inconspicuous and basophilic nucleoli at magnification of 400 times 
 Grade 2: Clearly visible and eosinophilic nucleoli at magnification of 400 times 
 Grade 3: Clearly visible nucleoli at magnification of 100 times 
 Grade 4: Extreme pleomorphism or rhabdoid and/or sarcomatoid morphology

Epidemiology 
 CCRCC most commonly affects male patients in their sixties and seventies.
 Majority of cases arise sporadically.
 Only 2–4% of the cases presenting as part of an inherited cancer syndrome, such as von Hippel–Lindau disease.

Images

References

Kidney cancer
Histopathology